Ester Sowernam is the pseudonymous author of one of the first defences of women published in England and a participant in the Swetnam Controversy of 1615–20. 

Sowernam's Ester Hath Hanged Haman: or an answere to a lewd pamphlet, entituled, the arraignment of women, with the arraignment of lewd, idle, froward, and unconstant men, and husbands (1617) was the second published response under a woman's name to Joseph Swetnam's misogynistic pamphlet The araignment of lewde, idle, froward and unconstant women (1615).  

In Ester Hath Hanged Haman, Sowernam finds that Swetnam has incorrectly stated that the Bible is the source of the statement that women are a necessary evil and finds that the true source is in Euripides Medea. She uses secular and religious arguments to refute Swetnams accusations. She also uses Latin phrases, references to events of antiquity, to the Bible, and to law to prove that all women are capable of mastering these subjects.

The only clue to Sowernams identity is the description on  the title page, which reads "neither Maide, Wife, nor Widdowe; yet really all and therefore experienced to defend all." Her use of numerous classic allusions, Latin phrases, legal jargon, and biblical references imply she was well educated.

Her pen name comes from the biblical character Esther in the Old Testament of the Bible, a Jewish heroine who defended the Israelites against Haman the Agagite.

References 

 (includes excerpt)
Susan Gushee O'Malley (ed.), 1996, The Early Modern Englishwoman: A Facsimile Library of Essential Works, Part 1: Printed Writings, 1500–1640, Volume 4, Defences of Women: Jane Anger, Rachel Speght, Ester Sowernam, and Constantia Munda, Scolar Press, 1996 (complete text of Protection)
 "Worthy women", New York Times, Thursday, 8 January 1987.
 "In the Battle Of the Sexes, This Word Is a Weapon", New York Times, 25 July 1999

1617 births
Year of death unknown
English women writers